Gabriel Alejandro Aldoney Vargas is a Chilean engineer and politician who served twice as Intendant of the Valparaíso Region.

Biography
Aldoney studied mechanical engineering at the Pontifical Catholic University of Valparaíso and later he did a MA in business administration at the Polytechnic University of Madrid.

Aldoney has served as an independent consultant in transportation systems. He was head of planning projects for the aircraft dispatch at Frankfurt Airport, advisor to the Ministry of Transport and Telecommunications, planning director of the Ministry of Public Works and national director of the Chilean Port Company.

Politics
From 1997 to 2000, he held the position of intendant of Valparaíso after being appointed by the president Eduardo Frei Ruiz-Tagle. In 2015, he was appointed again in that position by Michelle Bachelet, who decided it after Ricardo Bravo Oliva's resignation.

References

External Links
 Profile at the Ministry of the Interior 

1948 births
Living people 
21st-century Chilean politicians
Chilean people of English descent
Pontifical Catholic University of Valparaíso alumni
Polytechnic University of Madrid alumni
Socialist Party of Chile politicians
Intendants of Valparaíso Region
People from Marga Marga Province